Antonín Šolc (16 June 1928 – 5 January 1996) was a Czech footballer who played as a forward. He played his club football in Czechoslovakia for Dukla Prague, Jiskra Liberec and Baník Kladno.

References

1928 births
1996 deaths
Czech footballers
Czechoslovak footballers
Dukla Prague footballers
SK Kladno players
Association football forwards